Charles Lodwik was the 21st Mayor of New York City from 1694 to 1695.

Notes

Year of birth missing
Year of death missing
Mayors of New York City